Ernest Stanley Owens  (22 September 1916 - 3 June 1983) was an Australian businessman born in Armidale, New South Wales, Australia. He was a Commander of the Order of the British Empire.

He was a member of the Australian Institute of Management, and served on Sydney City Council from 1969 to 1974. He also served as president of the Civic Reform Association.

Amongst his appointments, he was Founding Chairman of Hill Samuel Australia (which is now known as Macquarie Group) and AUSSAT Pty Ltd (which after privatisation became known as Optus) and Chairman of Rolls-Royce Australia.

References

1916 births
1983 deaths
Australian Officers of the Order of the British Empire
20th-century Australian businesspeople